Telephone numbers in Norfolk Island use the following ranges:

Country code: +672
Area code: 3
International call prefix: 00
 Fixed numbers are of the format +672 3 2x xxx.
 Mobile numbers are of the format +672 3 5x xxx.

The country code +672 is also used for the Australian Antarctic Territory. The code was also used for Christmas Island and the Cocos Keeling Islands, using area codes 2 and 4 respectively. In October 1994, they were migrated to the +61 country code, under area code 091 (using exchange prefixes 62 for Christmas Island and 64 for the Cocos Islands). These numbers have since migrated to the 08 9162 and 08 9164 ranges.

Until 1975, code +672 was assigned to Portuguese Timor. When that territory was annexed by Indonesia in 1975, it used the Indonesian country code +62 and the area code 390. However, following the end of Indonesian rule in 1999, the code +672 9 was used under an interim arrangement to reach numbers in the territory.

References

Norfolk Island
Communications in Norfolk Island